Grant Township is a township in Jackson County, Kansas, USA.  As of the 2000 census, its population was 212. The southeasternmost part of the township is located within the Prairie Band Potawatomi Indian Reservation.

History
Grant Township was formed in 1870.

Geography
Grant Township covers an area of 42 square miles (108.77 square kilometers); of this, 0.04 square miles (0.11 square kilometers) or 0.1 percent is water.

Adjacent townships
 Soldier Township (north)
 Jefferson Township (northeast)
 Banner Township (east)
 Lincoln Township (southeast)
 Adrian Township (south)
 St. Clere Township, Pottawatomie County (southwest)
 Lincoln Township, Pottawatomie County (west)
 Grant Township, Pottawatomie County (northwest)

Cemeteries
The township contains two cemeteries: Boan and Olive Hill.

Major highways
 K-16

References
 U.S. Board on Geographic Names (GNIS)
 United States Census Bureau cartographic boundary files

External links
 US-Counties.com
 City-Data.com

Townships in Jackson County, Kansas
Townships in Kansas